Rifan Nahumarury (born 21 November 1994), is an Indonesian professional footballer who plays as a winger for Liga 2 club Kalteng Putra.

Club career

Martapura
In 2017, Rifan Nahumarury signed a contract with Liga 2 club Martapura. He made 21 league appearances and scored 8 goals for Martapura.

Mitra Kukar
In 2018, Rifan signed a year contract with Mitra Kukar to play in Liga 1 in the 2018 season. He made his league debut on 24 March 2018 in a match against Arema at the Kanjuruhan Stadium, Malang.

References

External links
 Rifan Nahumarury at Soccerway
 Rifan Nahumarury at Liga Indonesia

1994 births
Living people
Indonesian footballers
Association football midfielders
Sriwijaya F.C. players
Mitra Kukar players
Sportspeople from Maluku (province)